Vrede is a town in South Africa.

Vrede may also refer to:
"Vrede" (song), a song by Ruth Jacott

People with the surname
Ginty Vrede (1985–2008), Dutch kickboxer
Mitchell te Vrede (born 1991), Dutch footballer
Regillio Vrede (born 1973), Dutch footballer